American Yacht Club may refer to:

 American Yacht Club (Massachusetts), Newburyport, Massachusetts, US
 American Yacht Club (New York), Rye, New York, US